Louie Bernard is an American politician from the state of Louisiana. A Republican, Bernard has represented the 31st district of the Louisiana State Senate, based in Central Louisiana, since 2020.

From 1991 until 2016, Bernard served as Clerk of Court for Natchitoches Parish. He was first elected to the Senate in 2019, succeeding term-limited Republican incumbent Gerald Long.

References

Living people
People from Natchitoches Parish, Louisiana
People from Natchitoches, Louisiana
Republican Party Louisiana state senators
21st-century American politicians
Year of birth missing (living people)